is a Japanese manga series by Yūki Kanamaru. It has been serialized in Kadokawa Shoten's seinen manga magazine Young Ace since March 2018, with its chapters collected and published in nine tankōbon volumes as of October 2022. An anime television series adaptation by Studio Mother aired from October to December 2022.

Plot 
High school student Jirō Yakuin is an introvert who would rather keep to himself and play video games than interact with others. He has unrequited feelings for his childhood friend, Shiori Sakurazaka, but the school has implemented a  program, which has the students develop social skills on interacting with a partner as if they were married, and they are judged heavily on how well they work together through monitoring. Despite hoping to be paired with Shiori, Jiro is instead paired with Akari Watanabe, a gyaru who finds Jiro repulsive and who would rather be paired with the popular school idol, Minami Tenjin. Learning that if they attain enough points, their current partners can be switched, both Jiro and Akari agree to put their differences aside and work together. 

As the story proceeds, Jiro and Akari find themselves developing deeper feelings for each other as they "pretend" to get along, causing confusion between themselves as they struggle to sort out which feelings are real and which are not. Adding to the chaos is Shiori herself, who is revealed to also be in love with Jiro. Complications reach a near breaking point when during a time alone together, Minami tactfully turns down Akari's confession and helps her realize that she ended up actually falling in love with Jiro. Now with both girls aiming to have Jiro for themselves, Jiro himself struggles to decide which girl he should ultimately pursue.

Characters

Main 

A gyaru and the main female protagonist of the series, who becomes Jirō's partner during the couples training.  While Akari portrays an extroverted and confident nature, deep down she is actually very sweet, shy and kind towards her friends and loved ones. Her goal is to become the partner of Minami in the training, and she will do anything, even act like a well-behaved newlywed with Jirō. However, as the story progresses she loses her crush on Minami and falls in love with Jirō for real. Now, her new goal is to become an actual couple with Jirō but struggles to put her feelings into clarity, as well as dealing with Jiro's own insecurities.

The main male protagonist of the series, who was forced to pair up with Akari in the couples training. An awkward introvert who deals with self-esteem issues but very kind and hard working at heart. His main goal is to pair up with his childhood friend, Shiori, and he will do anything to reach his goal, even act like a well-behaved newlywed with Akari. As the story progresses, despite his feelings for Shiori, he finds himself developing deeper feelings for Akari, finding it harder and harder to let her go. 

Jirō's childhood friend and crush. Shy and kind, Shiori is a beautiful girl who ends up becoming Minami's partner in the couples training. Unbeknownst to Jiro, she also has feelings for him, hoping to earn enough points so that she could end up switching Minami for him. Her best friend is Mei; Shiori does not realize that Mei has an unrequited crush on her.

Supporting 

A popular and well liked school idol, Minami is the object of nearly every girl's affections, including Akari, who is hoping to become his partner during the couples training. Through circumstance, he ends up being Shiori's partner in the training. During an outing on a school trip, he ends up being confessed to by Akari but gently lets her down, revealing that he has unrequited feelings for a woman in his past. The woman, named Nozomi, was his former tutor that ended up marrying his older brother; it's hinted that his views on love are jaded due to accidentally witnessing his brother and Nozomi having sex with one another. Thanks to this conversation, Minami helps Akari realize that she is now in love with Jiro and wishes Akari luck with trying to win Jiro's heart. 

Jirō's best friend at high school who is the only person that Jiro will open up to despite his introverted nature. Like Jirō, Sadaharu also has lousy luck with women, preferring the women to be "2D" instead of real so they can't end up hurting his feelings. Despite this, Sadaharu is a good person at heart and will go out of his way to help his friend out a bind.

One of Akari's best friends, who is outgoing and assertive but wiser than she lets on. She is usually seen together with Natsumi, as both girls help giving Akari valuable life advice.

One of Akari's best friends, who is a bit of an airhead but nice at heart. She is usually seen together with Sachi, as both girls help giving Akari valuable life advice. 

A high school boy who is friends with Minami and has a crush on Akari. He hates Jirō for his indecisiveness towards Akari, despite having her as a "wife", and declares that he will fight for Akari's love and take her from Jirō.

The best friend of Shiori. Kind and supportive but also tough and fair when needed. She encourages Shiori to fight for Jirō's love, despite him being paired with Akari. Like Shu, she also finds Jirō's indecisiveness to be a detriment, sometimes putting her foot down and urging Jirō to fight for what he wants.

Publication 
More Than a Married Couple, But Not Lovers is written and illustrated by Yūki Kanamaru. The series began serialization in Kadokawa Shoten's Young Ace magazine on March 2, 2018. Kadokawa has collected its chapters into individual tankōbon volumes. The first volume was released on October 26, 2018. As of October 4, 2022, nine volumes have been released.

Volume list

Media

Anime 
An anime adaptation was announced on November 22, 2021. It was later confirmed to be a television series produced by Studio MOTHER and directed by Junichi Yamamoto, with Takao Kato serving as chief director, Naruhisa Arakawa handling the series' scripts, Chizuru Kobayashi designing the characters, and Yuri Habuka composing the music. It aired from October 9 to December 25, 2022, on AT-X and other channels. The opening theme song, "TRUE FOOL LOVE", is performed by Liyuu, while the ending theme song, "Stuck on You", is performed by Nowlu. Crunchyroll licensed the series, and have streamed an English dub starting on October 23, 2022. Medialink licensed the series in Southeast Asia.

Episode list

Notes

References

External links 
 More Than a Married Couple, But Not Lovers at Young Ace 
 More Than a Married Couple, But Not Lovers official anime website 
 

Anime series based on manga
Crunchyroll anime
Gyaru in fiction
Kadokawa Dwango franchises
Kadokawa Shoten manga
Medialink
Romantic comedy anime and manga
Seinen manga